Utah State Route 195 may refer to:

 Utah State Route 195 (1947–2007), a former state highway in northwestern Salt Lake County, Utah, United States
 Utah State Route 195 (1935-1947), a former state highway in northwestern Davis and southwestern Weber counties, Utah, United States